Michael Peter Hjälm (born March 23, 1963) is an ice hockey player who played for the Swedish national team. He won a bronze medal at the 1984 and 1988 Winter Olympics. Drafted by the Philadelphia Flyers in the 1982 NHL Entry Draft, Hjälm spent his entire 15 season playing career in Sweden.

Career statistics

Regular season and playoffs

International

References

External links

1963 births
Living people
Ice hockey players at the 1984 Winter Olympics
Ice hockey players at the 1988 Winter Olympics
IF Björklöven players
Medalists at the 1984 Winter Olympics
Modo Hockey players
Olympic bronze medalists for Sweden
Olympic ice hockey players of Sweden
Olympic medalists in ice hockey
Philadelphia Flyers draft picks
Rögle BK players
Ice hockey people from Stockholm
Swedish ice hockey left wingers
Medalists at the 1988 Winter Olympics